Brian Levin is an American softball coach who is currently an assistant coach at Iowa.

Coaching career

Belmont
On August 8, 2016, Levin was announced as the new head coach of the Belmont softball program. On June 14, 2019, Levin left the Belmont program to become the head coach at Southern Miss.

Southern Miss
On June 14, 2019, Levin was announced as the new head coach of the Southern Miss softball program. On July 12, 2022, Levin announced his resignation as head coach at Southern Miss.

Iowa
On July 20, 2022, Levin was announced as an assistant coach for the Iowa Hawkeyes softball program.

Head coaching record
Sources:

College

References

Living people
American softball coaches
Aquinas Saints softball players
Southern Miss Golden Eagles softball coaches
Iowa Hawkeyes softball coaches
Belmont Bruins softball coaches
Murray State Racers softball coaches
UMSL Tritons softball coaches
Year of birth missing (living people)